Yang Kyung-il (born March 26, 1970) is a South Korean manhwa artist from Incheon, South Korea. In 2009 he and frequent collaborator Youn In-wan began serializing their manga Defense Devil in Shonen Sunday.

Works 
 Area D: Inō Ryōiki
 Blade of Heaven
 Blade of the Phantom Master
 Burning Hell
 Defense Devil
 Deja-vu
 Island (with Youn In-wan)
 The Kingdom of the Gods (with Kim Eun-hee)
 March Story
 Zombie Hunter

Adaptations of Yang Kyung-il's works
 Kingdom (Netflix original series based on The Kingdom of the Gods)
 Kingdom (2019)
 Kingdom 2 (2020)
 Kingdom: Ashin of the North (2021)
 Island (OCN original based on Island, 2021)

References

South Korean manhwa artists
1970 births
Living people